Hauts-de-Seine is a département in the Île-de-France region of France. It covers Paris's western inner suburbs. It is bordered by Paris, Seine-Saint-Denis and Val-de-Marne to the east, Val-d'Oise to the north, Yvelines to the west and Essonne to the south. With a population of 1,624,357 (as of 2019) and a total area of 176 square kilometres (68 square miles), it is the second most highly densely populated department of France after Paris. It is the fifth most populous department in France. Its prefecture is Nanterre although Boulogne-Billancourt, one of its two subprefectures alongside Antony, has a larger population.

Hauts-de-Seine is best known for containing the modern office, cinema and shopping complex La Défense, one of Grand Paris's main economic centres and one of Europe's major business districts. Hauts-de-Seine is one of the wealthiest departments in France; it has the second highest GDP per capita in France at €106,800 in 2020. Its inhabitants are called Altoséquanais (masculine) and Altoséquanaises (feminine) in French.

History
From 1790 to 1968, Hauts-de-Seine was part of the former department of Seine.

The Hauts-de-Seine department was created in 1968, from parts of the former departments of Seine and Seine-et-Oise. Its creation reflected the implementation of a law passed in 1964; Nanterre had already been selected as the prefecture for the new department early in 1965.

In 2016, the Departmental Council of Hauts-de-Seine voted in favour of a fusion of Hauts-de-Seine and Yvelines, its western neighbour. Following a similar vote in Yvelines, an établissement public interdépartemental was established. The fusion project was abandoned in 2021, but the cooperation between the two departments continues.

Demographics

Population development since 1881

Place of birth of residents

Geography

Location
Hauts-de-Seine and two other small departments (Seine-Saint-Denis and Val-de-Marne) form an inner ring around Paris, known as the Petite Couronne (literal translation: "Little Crown"). Together with the City of Paris, they are included in Greater Paris since 1 January 2016. It is the Smallest Department in France followed by Seine-Saint-Denis and Val-de-Marne. It is slightly smaller than Maldives. The whole of the department is a salient which is looks like Warwickshire in England, within the districts of North Warwickshire, Nuneaton and Bedworth, and Rugby.

Administration
Hauts-de-Seine comprises three departmental arrondissements and 36 communes:

Economy
Hauts-de-Seine is one of France's wealthiest departments and one of Europe's richest areas. Its GDP per capita was €106,800 in 2020, according to Eurostat official figures.

Politics
In the 1990s and early 2000s, Hauts-de-Seine received national media attention as the result of a corruption scandal concerning the misuse of public funds provided for the department's housing projects. Implicated were former minister and departmental council president Charles Pasqua, as well as other personalities of the Rally for the Republic (RPR) party.

Hauts-de-Seine was the political base of Nicolas Sarkozy, President of the French Republic from 2007 to 2012. He was Mayor of Neuilly-sur-Seine (1983–2002) and President of the Departmental Council of Hauts-de-Seine (2004–2007) before he assumed the office. Sarkozy succeeded Pasqua as President of the Departmental Council.

Departmental Council of Hauts-de-Seine

Hauts-de-Seine is governed by a departmental council. Its 46 members are called departmental councillors. The electorate of Hauts-de-Seine usually votes for right-wing parties; there has never been a left-wing majority since the department's inception in 1968.

The departmental council is the deliberative organ of the department. The executive is led by the council president, assisted by vice presidents, in charge of various portfolios. Departmental councillors are elected (two per canton) by the department's inhabitants for six-year terms (no term limits). The president of the Departmental Council is Georges Siffredi, elected in 2020.

Presidential elections 2nd round

National representation

Hauts-de-Seine elected the following members of the National Assembly in the 2017 legislative election:

In the Senate, Hauts-de-Seine is represented by:
 André Gattolin (LREM), since 2011
 Xavier Iacovelli (LREM), since 2017
 Roger Karoutchi (LR), since 2009
 Christine Lavarde (LR), since 2017
 Hervé Marseille (UDI), since 2011
 Pierre Ouzoulias (PCF), since 2017
 Philippe Pemezec (LR), since 2017

Tourism

References

External links
  Website of the Departmental council
  Prefecture website

 
1968 establishments in France
Île-de-France region articles needing translation from French Wikipedia
Departments of Île-de-France
States and territories established in 1968